Hai Bà Trưng (Trưng Sisters District) is one of the four original urban districts (quận) of Hanoi, the capital city of Vietnam. The district currently has 18 wards, covering a total area of 10.26 square kilometers. It is bordered by Long Biên district, Đống Đa district, Thanh Xuân district, Hoàng Mai district, Hoàn Kiếm district. As of 2019, there were 303,586 people residing in the district, the population density is 30,000 inhabitants per square kilometer.

Established as one of the first four central districts of the city, it is named after the two heroines in Vietnamese history: the Trưng Sisters. Some of Vietnam's largest universities are located here, including the Hanoi University of Technology, Hanoi National Economic University, and  Hanoi University of Civil Engineering.

Administrative divisions
Hai Bà Trưng district is divided into 18 wards (Bách Khoa, Bạch Đằng, Bạch Mai, Cầu Dền, Đống Mác, Đồng Nhân, Đồng Tâm, Lê Đại Hành, Minh Khai, Nguyễn Du, Phạm Đình Hổ, Phố Huế, Quỳnh Lôi, Quỳnh Mai, Thanh Lương, Thanh Nhàn, Trương Định, Vĩnh Tuy).

References

Districts of Hanoi
Trưng sisters